Participating teams were required to notify COPAG of their final team rosters by September 14, a month before the Games began.

Group A

Manager:  Mario Mendoza

2 ACOSTA Alberto P 1.95/6'5" 81.6/180 R L 25 AUG 1975
3 VEGA Jonathan OF L R 3 FEB 1979
4 GONZALEZ David C 1.80/5'11" 108.8/240 R R 16 JAN 1979
5 BETHANCOURT Euclides P R L 23 NOV 1980
9 MACIAS Jose IF L L 25 JAN 1972
10 MUÑOZ Carlos C 1.72/5'8" R R 16 OCT 1979
11 PATIÑO Jeffer IF 1.76/5'9" 80.2/177 R L 8 OCT 1988
14 CASTRO Yeliar P R L 7 JUL 1989
15 BISHOP Jorge IF R R 7 JUL 1989
16 NAVARRO Eliecer P 1.83/6'0" 86.0/190 L L 26 OCT 1987
20 RODRIGUEZ Concepcion OF R R 19 SEP 1986
21 QUINTERO Cesar C 1.87/6'2" 99.7/220 L R 19 MAR 1981
22 CHAVEZ Angel IF 1.93/6'4" 95.2/210 R R 6 APR 1983
23 QUIROZ Carlos IF 1.84/6'0" 102.5/226 R R 30 NOV 1985
24 RIVERA Adolfo OF L R 5 MAR 1982
27 ATENCIO Abraham P L L 16 FEB 1969
34 GONZALEZ Saul P 1.85/6'1" 95.2/210 R L 19 SEP 1988
39 GONZALEZ Gustavo P 1.82/6'0" 60.0/132 L L 13 MAY 1986
42 GOMEZ Gustavo P R L 24 MAY 1991
45 MACHUCA Luis P 1.85/6'1" 92.9/205 R L 16 MAR 1988
71 MORENO Francis Eloy P 1.90/6'3" 108.8/240 R L 11 OCT 1985
77 CASTILLO Javier IF 1.95/6'5" 108.8/240 R R 29 AUG 1983
81 MENDEZ Gilberto P 1.86/6'1" 98.0/216 R L 15 NOV 1974
Manager: 19 IBARRA Miguel
Coaches: BARE Amadeo
40 HERNANDEZ Claudino
59 MALDONADO Carlos
88 LEAVER Alberto

Manager:  Ernie Young

1 CRUZ Enrique P/IF 1.85/6'1" 81.6/180 R R 21 NOV 1981
4 CESAR Dionys OF 1.85/6'1" 88.5/195 R S 27 SEP 1973
6 RICHARDSON Juan IF 1.85/6'1" 97.5/215 R R 27 NOV 1979
7 CASTILLO Silvio Alexander C 1.89/6'2" 88.5/195 R R 29 NOV 1985
8 CAMPUSANO Jose OF 1.80/5'11" 81.6/180 R S 19 DEC 1983
9 GONZALEZ Angel IF 1.83/6'0" 88.0/194 R S 28 DEC 1985
14 DE LA CRUZ Cristopher IF 1.83/6'0" 81.6/180 R S 5 MAR 1982
15 NOVOA Yunior P 1.95/6'5" 81.6/180 L L 9 NOV 1984
17 GOMEZ Alexis OF 1.89/6'2" 88.5/195 L L 8 AUG 1978
19 SALAS Juan P 1.89/6'2" 86.2/190 R R 11 JUL 1979
20 CRUZ Rafael P 1.98/6'6" 104.3/230 R R 19 MAY 1977
22 PEÑA Juan Antonio P 1.89/6'2" 81.6/180 L L 12 APR 1977
23 FORTUNATO Bartolome P 1.85/6'1" 83.9/185 R R 24 AUG 1974
26 CRUZETA Francisco P 1.89/6'2" 97.5/215 R R 7 APR 1981
27 HERNÁNDEZ Runelvys P 1.92/6'4" 90.7/200 R R 27 APR 1978
28 VERAS Dario P 1.83/6'0" 77.1/170 R R 13 MAR 1973
29 SANCHEZ Danilo C 1.80/5'11" 104.3/230 R R 25 OCT 1980
34 DURAN Logan P 1.89/6'2" 84.4/186 R R 8 DEC 1981
38 HERNÁNDEZ Francisco C 1.83/6'0" 90.7/200 R S 2 APR 1986
39 OTAÑEZ Willis IF 1.85/6'1" 90.7/200 R R 19 APR 1973
45 ALVAREZ YSABEL Mario P 1.85/6'1" 86.2/190 R R 26 MAR 1984
49 NOVOA PEÑA Roberto P 1.98/6'6" 90.7/200 R R 15 AUG 1979
50 MENDEZ Victor OF 1.80/5'11" 90.7/200 R S 28 JUN 1980
81 CASTRO Bernabet IF 1.78/5'10" 77.1/170 R S 14 JUN 1979
Manager: 30 GONZALEZ Denio
Coaches: 24 CANO Joselito
25 BRITO Domingo Antonio
99 RIJO Rafael

Group B

3 FIGUEROA Luis Rafael IF L S 22 SEP 1970
10 FUENTES Reymond OF L R 12 FEB 1991
17 VALENTIN Jose U L L 19 SEP 1976
19 VAZQUEZ Christian C L R 21 AUG 1990
20 FLORES Adalberto P L L 11 APR 1986
22 SOTO Neftali IF L R 16 DEC 1984
23 FELICIANO Jesus P L L 6 JUN 1979
26 RODRIGUEZ Julio E. P R L 29 AUG 1990
29 CANDELARIA Antonio IF R R 13 OCT 1981
31 ORTIZ Wilberto I. IF L R 30 JAN 1985
34 CRESPO Cesar A. OF L S 23 MAY 1979
35 DOMINGUEZ Jeffry IF L R 31 JUL 1986
38 SANTIAGO Andres M. P R R 26 OCT 1989
39 DE LA TORRE Jose P R L 17 OCT 1985
41 TORRES Joseph P L L 9 MAR 1982
42 MALDONADO Ivan P R L 7 JUN 1980
43 SOTO Yariel C R R 29 OCT 1988
49 DIAZ Juan C. IF R R 21 JUN 1986
50 SANTIAGO Tomas P R L 30 OCT 1981
55 BOCACHICA Hiram OF L R 3 APR 1976
61 FUENTES Nelvin P R R 4 JUL 1989
62 PADILLA Juan Miguel P R L 29 MAR 1973
65 NIEVES Efrain Javier P L L 14 APR 1978
77 MEJIAS Miguel P R R 4 JUL 1989

1 DUVERGEL Giorvis OF L L 9 AUG 1979
10 GOURRIEL Yulieski IF R R 6 SEP 1984
11 ALARCON Yosvany C R R 15 OCT 1984
12 ENRIQUEZ Michel IF R R 2 NOV 1979
13 PESTANO Ariel Osvaldo C R R 31 JAN 1974
15 ALVAREZ Freddy Asiel P R L 29 APR 1989
16 SOTO Alberto Cesar P R R 18 JUN 1988
23 ODELIN Vicyohandri P R L 26 FEB 1980
24 CEPEDA Frederich OF R S 4 AUG 1980
27 MARTINEZ Jonder P R L 22 JUN 1978
28 OLIVERA Hector IF R R 4 MAY 1985
32 GONZALEZ Norberto P L L 10 OCT 1979
38 CASTILLO Rusney OF R R 7 SEP 1987
42 LAHERA Miguel P R L 24 JAN 1985
45 MOREJON Frank Camilo C R R 25 JAN 1986
48 GONZALEZ Yulieski P L L 20 JUN 1980
50 REYES Rudith IF R R 11 MAY 1979
54 DESPAIGNE Alfredo OF R R 17 JUN 1986
62 PEDROSO Yadier P R L 4 SEP 1986
71 ARRUEBARRUENA Erisbel IF R R 25 MAR 1990
75 GONZALEZ Miguel Alfredo P R L 23 SEP 1986
79 ABREU Jose Dariel IF R R 29 JAN 1987
88 BELL Alexeis OF R R 10 FEB 1983
94 HINOJOSA Dalier P R L 2 OCT 1986
Manager: 8 URQUIOLA Alfonso
Coaches: 49 GALVEZ Juan Javier
57 MEDINA Jose Roberto
60 AGUIAR Ronny
82 HERNANDEZ Jose Eumelio

Manager:  Ernie Whitt

4 GRANADILLO Antonio Jose IF 1.80/5'11" 86.0/190 R R 8 OCT 1983
5 LUQUE Roger P 1.78/5'10" 84.0/185 L L 8 JAN 1980
7 APONTE Juan C 1.86/6'1" 90.0/198 R R 2 MAR 1988
9 ANGULO Oscar David IF 1.77/5'10" 78.0/172 R R 2 JAN 1984
10 CARDONA Rodolfo IF 1.76/5'9" 76.0/168 R R 27 NOV 1986
15 COLMENAREZ Juan P 1.79/5'10" 82.0/181 L L 22 OCT 1986
17 SIVIRA Yonathan OF 1.78/5'10" 78.0/172 R R 25 JAN 1984
18 VASQUEZ Wuillians OF 1.89/6'2" 90.0/198 R R 26 JUL 1983
21 LARA Hebert OF 1.80/5'11" 85.0/187 L L 29 JUN 1988
24 ACUÑA Ronald Jose OF 1.89/6'2" 95.0/209 R R 30 JUN 1979
25 ALEN Luis Jose C 1.79/5'10" 83.0/183 R R 16 APR 1985
26 CARREÑO Josmar P 1.81/5'11" 83.0/183 R R 13 AUG 1987
30 RIVAS Arturo OF 1.82/6'0" 102.0/225 R R 2 FEB 1984
31 ALFARO Gabriel P 1.86/6'1" 93.0/205 R R 26 JUN 1983
32 TORRES Luis P 1.80/5'11" 87.0/192 R R 6 JUN 1979
36 REYES Jesus P 1.80/5'11" 83.0/183 L L 26 FEB 1982
37 AZOCAR Luis P 1.83/6'0" 85.0/187 L L 9 JUN 1986
41 TORRES Saul IF 1.86/6'1" 90.0/198 R R 18 FEB 1982
45 CARABALLO Jhonny P 1.86/6'1" 86.0/190 R R 23 AUG 1985
47 YEPEZ Jesus Maria P 1.82/6'0" 90.0/198 L L 15 APR 1984
48 GUZMÁN Jorge P 1.81/5'11" 83.0/183 R R 14 AUG 1991
49 DELGADO George P 1.90/6'3" 89.0/196 L L 22 MAR 1984
55 FUENTES Juan C 1.83/6'0" 94.0/207 R R 28 JAN 1986
56 MORY Carlos Enrique P 1.80/5'11" 89.0/196 R R 15 MAY 1980
Manager: 8 SOJO Luis
Coaches: 6 ESCOBAR Oscar
19 MURO Ivan
28 CARRARA Giovanni
54 MARTINEZ Romulo

References

Team
Team squads at the 2011 Pan American Games
Baseball tournament squads